Curtis Eugene Bennett (December 16, 1935 – January 26, 2011) was an American football coach. He served as the head football coach at Sterling College in Sterling, Kansas for 13 seasons over three stints, compiling a record of 59–60–3 His first tenure was from 1966 until the end of the 1973 season. He coached again for one year in 1981 and finally from 1997 until 2000.

Bennett graduated from Sterling High School in 1953. He attended Hutchinson Junior College—now known as Hutchinson Community College—in Hutchinson, Kansas, where he played football as a halfback for two season. Bennett transferred to Sterling College and set an National Association of Intercollegiate Athletics (NAIA) record in 1956 with 2,166 total yards of offense.

Bennett died on January 26, 2011.

Head coaching record

References

External links
 

1935 births
2011 deaths
American football halfbacks
Hutchinson Blue Dragons football players
Sterling Warriors football coaches
Sterling Warriors football players
People from Sterling, Kansas
Coaches of American football from Kansas
Players of American football from Kansas